Paddy Quinn may refer to:

Paddy Quinn (American football)
Paddy Quinn (baseball) (1849–1909), American baseball player
Paddy Quinn (Irish republican) (born 1962), IRA activist

See also
Patrick Quinn (disambiguation)
Pat Quinn (disambiguation)